Guido Rosselli (born May 25, 1983) is an Italian professional basketball player. He plays as shooting guard or small forward. He is currently playing with Scaligera Verona of the LBA.

External links
 Italian League Profile 
 Italian Legadue League Profile 

1983 births
Living people
Auxilium Pallacanestro Torino players
Italian men's basketball players
Pallacanestro Biella players
Pistoia Basket 2000 players
Reyer Venezia players
Scaligera Basket Verona players
Shooting guards
Small forwards